The Coleman Frog (also known as Cornelia Webster) is a  frog statue on display at the Fredericton Region Museum in Fredericton, New Brunswick, Canada, since 1959. It was previously owned by a man named Fred Coleman, who ran a nearby lodge in the 1880s.

Description 
Supposedly, the immense size of the frog was caused by the fact that Coleman fed it whiskey, baked beans, june bugs, buttermilk toddies, and whey. It died in a "dynamite accident" and was sent to Bangor, Maine, to be stuffed.

Controversy 
Skeptics say that the frog is a fake that was used to promote a cough syrup that would "relieve the frog in your throat". In a 1988 report, the Canadian Conservative Institute refers to the artifact as consisting of canvas, wax, and paint. In a letter it refers the exhibit as “an amusing example of a colossal fake and deception”. The museum will not allow DNA testing to be performed on the frog, to confirm if it is real or a fake.

See also
Fur-bearing trout

References

Taxidermy hoaxes
Hoaxes in Canada
Individual frogs
Individual animals in Canada
Fredericton